= Pipaliya Berkhedi =

- village
- Location within Madhya Pradesh Location within India
- Coordinates: 23.107455°N 77.418154°E
- Country: India
- State: Madhya Pradesh
- District: Bhopal
- Tehsil: Huzur

Population (2011)
  - Total: 6
- Time zone: UTC+5:30 (IST)
- ISO 3166 code: MP-IN
- Census code: 482529

Pipaliya Berkhedi is a village in the Bhopal district of Madhya Pradesh, India. It is located in the Huzur tehsil and the Phanda block.

== Demographics ==
According to the 2011 census of India, Pipaliya Berkhedi has 2 households. The effective literacy rate (i.e. the literacy rate of population excluding children aged 6 and below) is 16.67%.

Demographics (2011 Census)
	Total	Male	Female
Population	6	4	2
Children aged below 6 years	0	0	0
Scheduled caste	0	0	0
Scheduled tribe	0	0	0
Literates	1	1	0
Workers (all)	4	3	1
Main workers (total)	3	2	1
Main workers: Cultivators	1	1	0
Main workers: Agricultural labourers	2	1	1
Main workers: Household industry workers	0	0	0
Main workers: Other	0	0	0
Marginal workers (total)	1	1	0
Marginal workers: Cultivators	0	0	0
Marginal workers: Agricultural labourers	1	1	0
Marginal workers: Household industry workers	0	0	0
Marginal workers: Others	0	0	0
Non-workers	2	1	1
